Don or Donald McKenzie (also Mackenzie or MacKenzie) may refer to:

Sports
 Don MacKenzie (rower) (1874–1925), Canadian rower who won a medal at the 1904 Summer Olympics
 Don MacKenzie (footballer), English footballer, winger for Rochdale 
 D. K. A. MacKenzie (1916–1940), Scottish rugby union player
 Don McKenzie (Canadian football) (c. 1920–2001), Canadian football player
 Don McKenzie (footballer, born 1927) (1927–1987), Scottish footballer for Grimsby Town
 Don McKenzie (footballer, born 1939), Australian rules footballer with Essendon
 Don McKenzie (footballer, born 1942), Australian rules footballer and coach of Footscray
 Don McKenzie (swimmer) (1947–2008), American Olympic swimmer
 Donnie McKenzie (born 1960), British Olympic fencer
 Donald MacKenzie (archer), American archer
 Don McKenzie (curler) (born 1957), Canadian curler

Politics
 Donald McKenzie (explorer) (1753–1851), Scottish-Canadian explorer and governor of the Red River Settlement
 Donald Mackenzie, Lord Mackenzie (1818–1875), Scottish judge, styled Lord Mackenzie
 Donald MacKenzie (Ontario politician), provincial politician from Middlesex East, 1883–1886
 Donald Gordon McKenzie (1887–1963), member of the Legislative Assembly of Manitoba
 Donald Mackenzie-Kennedy (1889–1965), Governor of Nyasaland (1939–1942)

Others
 Donald Alexander Mackenzie (1873–1936), Scottish journalist and writer on mythology
 Donald C. MacKenzie (born c. 1930s), Canadian Forces Air Command general
Donald McKenzie (academic) (1931–1999), New Zealander bibliographer
 Donald Angus MacKenzie (born 1950), professor of sociology at the University of Edinburgh, Scotland
 Don McKenzie (sports medicine), Canadian founder of Abreast in a Boat

See also 
 The Strength of Donald McKenzie, 1916 American silent short film
McKenzie Lectures, in memory of Donald McKenzie, bibliographer